Argentulia gentilii is a species of moth of the family Tortricidae. It is found in Neuquén Province, Argentina.

The ground colour of the forewings is yellow with a brown patch, joining a uniform, brown terminal band. There is a brown streak along the base of the costal margin. The hindwings are uniform grey brown.

Etymology
The species is named in honour of Argentinian lepidopterist Mario Gentili, who collected the holotype.

References

Moths described in 1998
Euliini
Moths of South America